Carex subg. Vignea is a subgenus of the sedge genus Carex, containing around 300 of the 2000 species in the genus. Its members are characterised by having bisexual, sessile spikes, where the female flowers have two stigmas each.

Carex subg. Vignea has been repeatedly found to be monophyletic in molecular phylogenetic analysis, with Carex gibba (which, exceptionally for the section, has three stigmas per female flower) as the sister group to the rest of the subgenus. It contains the following sections:

Carex sect. Ammoglochin
Carex sect. Baldenses
Carex sect. Bracteosae
Carex sect. Chordorrhizae
Carex sect. Deweyanae
Carex sect. Dispermae
Carex sect. Divisae
Carex sect. Echinochloomorphae
Carex sect. Foetidae
Carex sect. Gibbae
Carex sect. Glareosae
Carex sect. Grallatoriae
Carex sect. Heleoglochin
Carex sect. Holarrhenae
Carex sect. Incurvae
Carex sect. Inversae
Carex sect. Macrocephalae
Carex sect. Multiflorae
Carex sect. Ovales
Carex sect. Phaestoglochin
Carex sect. Phleoideae
Carex sect. Physodeae
Carex sect. Physoglochin
Carex sect. Potosinae
Carex sect. Remotae
Carex sect. Stellulatae
Carex sect. Stenorhynchae
Carex sect. Thomsonianae
Carex sect. Vulpinae

See also
List of Carex species

References

Carex
Plant subgenera